The Battle of Bronkhorstspruit was the first major engagement of the First Boer War. It took place by the Bronkhorstspruit river, to the east of the town of Bronkhorstspruit, Transvaal, on 20 December 1880. Threatened by the growing numbers of militant Boers in the Pretoria region, the British recalled the 94th Regiment of Foot, which had companies garrisoned in towns and villages across the wider area. The regiment's commanding officer, Lieutenant Colonel Philip Robert Anstruther, led a 34-wagon column consisting of roughly 250 men on a  journey from Lydenburg back to Pretoria. A similar sized Boer commando force, led by Francois Gerhardus Joubert was ordered to intercept and stop the British.

Despite several warnings of the threat of attack, the British travelled largely unprepared for combat, and the large number of wagons they travelled with slowed their progress significantly. On 20 December, 24 days after receiving the order to return, Anstruther's column was confronted by the Boers. After demanding under truce that the British discontinue their march, which Anstruther refused, the Boers attacked. The British took heavy casualties and surrendered after about 15 minutes, the majority of their surviving men being captured. Anstruther was badly wounded and died of his injuries a few days later.

Background
Southern Africa was first settled by Europeans in the mid 17th century, when the Dutch set up a provision station at the Cape of Good Hope. Over the subsequent decades, more settlers followed, and moved further inland. These settlers, known as Free Burghers, established an independence that became a distinctive feature of their descendants, the Boers. They believed in their divine right to the land, and a superiority over the African natives.  The British captured the colony based at the Cape in the early 19th century, as it provided a strategic advantage during the Napoleonic Wars. The British imposed their 1833 slavery ban—which made the purchase or ownership of slaves illegal—on the Boers, which drove them further north to the Transvaal and Natal. The British expanded their territory in southern Africa throughout the 19th century, annexing Natal in 1842, and then Griqualand West in 1873 and Transvaal in 1877. The last of these annexations occurred despite the fact that Britain had previously recognised the independence of the Boer South African Republic in that region. 

Transvaal had a population of around 36,000 to 45,000 Boers, mostly spread around the countryside on their farms, and around 5,000 British settlers. Pretoria, the capital, had a population of roughly 2,250. The majority of the Boer population opposed the annexation, and considered the British to be an occupying force. The Boers sent political delegations to London in 1877 and 1878, but on both occasions their pleas to reverse the annexation were rejected. By the end of 1879 the elimination of the Zulu and Bapedi threats had removed any tolerance that the majority of the Boer population may have had for the protective presence of British troops and administrators in the Transvaal. Demonstrations were held against what was seen as an unjustifiable and unnecessary occupation. By March 1880 the election of a new Liberal Government in London, known to oppose the annexation, had quieted unrest in the Transvaal. However Prime Minister William Ewart Gladstone, concerned with Irish and other issues, had informed the Boer leaders that the British Empire would not relinquish the Transvaal. As a result, the Boer leadership began to prepare for an insurrection.

Prelude
An armed party of a hundred Boers, led by Piet Cronjé, arrived in support of Bezuindenhout and reclaimed the wagon, returning it to Bezuindenhout. This led Lanyon to mobilise men from the Pretoria garrison to arrest the Boers, but when it became clear that he did not have sufficient men to deal with the growing threat of a general uprising, he made the decision to recall men from outlying garrisons, to concentrate his strength in Pretoria while he waited for reinforcements from Natal. In all, he had around 1,800 regular troops spread around the Transvaal region to protect British interests, primarily composed of the 94th Regiment of Foot and the 2nd Battalion, 21st Regiment (Royal Scots Fusiliers). Roughly 700 of these were centred in Pretoria, with the rest stationed in the smaller towns of Rustenburg, Lydenburg, Marabastad, Standerton and Wakkerstroom.

British troop movement from Lydenburg

On 27 November Lieutenant Colonel Philip Robert Anstruther, who was commanding the garrison at Lydenburg, received orders to withdraw his men to reinforce Pretoria. The garrison comprised the headquarters and two companies of the 94th Regiment, roughly 300–330 men. Similar orders were sent to the other regimental companies garrisoned at Marabastad and Wakkerstroom. The soldiers based in Marabastad left that village on 30 November, and arrived in Pretoria on 10 December. Anstruther meanwhile delayed his departure, waiting for additional wagons to be acquired. Rather than set off with the regulation-standard number of wagons (roughly 10 to 12), Anstruther waited until he had 34, in order to carry personal items, rations and all the quartermaster's stores. This delayed his departure on the  journey to 5 December. He left roughly 60 men to hold Lydenburg, taking somewhere in the region of 245–270 soldiers, two wives, a widow and two children back to Pretoria.

They reached Middelburg, less than halfway through their journey, on 15 December, and remained there the following day to allow their oxen to rest. A further delay ensued the following day; the column reached the Olifants River, but was unable to cross due to the high water levels. During this wait, Anstruther received communication from Colonel William Bellairs warning him of the possibility of a surprise attack as the Boers were taking up arms in the area. Anstruther had also been warned by apparently friendly Boers that insurgents were trying to turn local sympathies against his progress. The modern historian John Laband describes Anstruther as seeming "bluff, good-natured and unfussed, with an amiable contempt for the Boers whose ability to take strong, concerted action he discounted."

Despite the warnings they had received, when they set off the next morning, the soldiers were only carrying 30 rounds of ammunition per man, rather than the regulation 70; only four scouts were posted, two ahead and two behind the main body; and the 40 men of the band were playing, leaving them unarmed.

Boer commando force
While Anstruther's column marched from Lydenburg, thousands of Boers were gathering around Pretoria, and on 13 December they elected leaders and declared independence from British rule, reestablishing the South African Republic. Francois Gerhardus Joubert (who was the uncle of Piet Joubert, one of the triumvirate of Boer leaders) was ordered by the Boer leadership to stop Anstruther from reaching Pretoria. He left Heidelberg on 18 December, and rendezvoused with two other forces en route. They camped halfway between Pretoria and Bronkhorstspruit overnight on 19 December, and next morning planned their attack. Nicolaas Smit, who had combat experience from the Anglo-Pedi Wars, suggested flexibility rather than a set ambush, and so they continued east towards Middelburg to intercept the British column. Laband also says that Francois Joubert mobilised the Boer militia in Middelburg, ordering them to travel parallel to the British, but hidden from them.

Opposing forces

The British infantry were armed with the Martini–Henry Mk III rifle, firing  ammunition, and fitted with a  bayonet. They wore the traditional red coat of the British Army, with blue trousers. A few months after the battle of Bronkhorstspruit, a question was raised in the British parliament, which criticised the uniforms for being "conspicuous", and therefore allowed "the Boers to shoot them down without danger to themselves". In response, Hugh Childers, the Secretary of State for War said there was no need to change the uniforms, though the red coat was phased out over the subsequent eighteen years. The exact composition of the British column at Bronkhorstspruit is unclear; Laband lists 6 officers and 246 men in the 94th Regiment, along with 2 officers and 4 or 5 men from the Army Service Corps, a surgeon of the Army Medical Department, and 3 men from the Army Hospital Corps. Another historian, G. R. Duxbury only attributed the 94th Regiment with 6 officers and 230 men, while broadly agreeing on the other figures. According to the British historian Ian Castle, after having fought in the Anglo-Zulu War of 1879, a series of battles against Sekhukhune, and then experienced "tedious periods of garrison duty in isolated posts", the 94th Regiment were low on morale, and facing increasing levels of desertion.

The Boers had no standing army, nor any formal command structure. Instead, every Boer male (known as a burgher) between the ages of 16 and 60 was required to be ready for unpaid military service. They had no uniforms, and had to provide their own horse, tack, rifle and 30 rounds of ammunition. Each town raised its own militia unit, known as a commando, which depending on the population of the area could vary in number widely, from 60 to 4,000. Many Boers were keen hunters, and typically learned to shoot as children. They used a variety of rifles, but the most common was the  calibre Westley Richards, a falling-block, breech-loading rifle. The South African historian Felix Machanik suggested that although common wisdom held that the British had the superior firearms and firepower, he believed the Boers held an advantage, "because they were second to none in handling and firing their weapons and they fired and re-loaded with such rapidity that the British were often misled into thinking that there were three or four times as many as there actually were." They typically fought as mounted infantry, and employed guerrilla tactics, using the mobility provided by the horses to mount surprise attacks on their opponents and allow them a quick retreat if needed. The Boer commando force at Bronkhorstspruit is variously estimated by modern historians to have contained 200–300 men, though contemporary British reports often exaggerated that figure; an article appearing in The Daily Telegraph in March 1881 for example, reported the force to number between 1,200 and 1,500.

Battle
The two Boer forces rendezvoused during the morning of the 20th and waited for the British column. Once their scouts reported that the column had been sighted, they moved into a valley to the south of the road the British were travelling along, and spread out into a skirmishing line. They were hidden from the road by a shallow ridge, but there was only sparse cover provided by thin thorn bushes. Around midday, one of the advance British scouts, riding around  ahead of Anstruther and the column, thought he spotted a group of Boers moving to a farmhouse off the road. Anstruther looked through his own binoculars and dismissed the scout's concern, suggesting it had probably just been some cattle. Anstruther rode back to the column, where he ordered a halt, for the wagons to close up, and for his soldiers to prepare. While he did so, a Boer rider, Paul de Beer, approached under a flag of truce, and Anstruther with two of his officers walked out to meet him. The messenger, who spoke English, presented Anstruther with a letter from the Boer leaders in Heidelberg, instructing him to "stop where you are", and that any further movement towards Pretoria would be interpreted as a "declaration of war, the responsibility whereof we put on your shoulders." Laband records that de Beer told Anstruther he had five minutes to respond, while Duxbury suggests it was only two minutes. Nonetheless, Anstruther replied that his orders were to continue to Pretoria, and that was what he was going to do, but that he did not want a confrontation. De Beer pressed Anstruther directly, twice asking if he wanted war or peace, to which Anstruther repeated that he intended to continue his journey. 

While this discussion had been happening, the Boers had closed to within  on the British column, and their numbers had grown to 250–300. De Beer rode back to the Boer commando, but before he could locate Joubert, one of the other Boer leaders, Smit, ordered the attack. The main body of the Boers galloped towards the road and jumped to the ground, spreading themselves out behind any cover available and opened fire. The close-range attack was highly effective; the British were generally in close formation and had not taken cover behind the wagons. The Boers targeted the officers and NCOs first, and sustained rifle fire pinned the British down. As many of the column were either unarmed, such as the band, or carrying insufficient ammunition, this left them unable to effectively respond to the attack. The return shots that they did fire typically went high, over the heads of the Boers, which contemporary reports on both sides attributed to the British having their sights set to the wrong distance. Within 15 minutes, all of the British officers were either killed or seriously wounded, including Anstruther, who had received five wounds to the legs. Seeing that their situation was lost, Anstruther ordered his men to surrender to prevent further loss of life.

Both Laband and Duxbury settle on 157 British casualties; Laband gives 5 officers and 63 men killed, 4 officers and 85 men wounded; while Duxbury suggests 77 killed and a further 80 wounded. The Boers, in comparison, suffered only light casualties; 1 or 2 killed and 4 or 5 others wounded.

Aftermath
The Boers looted as much as they could from the British; weapons, ammunition, clothing, wagons and horses, but left tents, blankets and rations for the British to establish a camp for their wounded. Twenty of the unwounded British soldiers were allowed to remain to tend to the wounded and two were allowed to travel to Pretoria to bring back British medical assistance. One of these, Conductor Egerton, smuggled the British colours from the battle; they had been hidden on one of the stretchers under the wounded Mrs Fox, and he then wrapped them around his body to get them to Pretoria. The three British women present, Mrs Fox, Mrs Maistré and Mrs Smith, were all subsequently awarded the Royal Red Cross for tending to the wounded during the battle. After having one of his legs amputated, Anstruther died from his wounds on 26 December. In January, those who had not recovered were evacuated to Pretoria for further care, while around 30 of those who had recovered were taken as additional prisoners by the Boers. Most of the prisoners were later released. 

The battle of Bronkhorstspruit was the first military action of the First Boer War, and was a morale-boosting victory for the Boers. In contrast, for the British, who had been dismissive of the military effectiveness of the Boers prior to the battle, it was a humbling experience. To deflect from the scale of the loss, senior British officers both criticised the Boers for advancing on the British column under a white flag, and placed the blame on Anstruther, cited his "neglect" and "absence of caution". Despite this, Major General Sir George Pomeroy Colley, the Army's commander-in-chief in Transvaal and Natal, acknowledged in a despatch to the British government that: "This will materially alter situation, as encouraging Boers, who will now also feel themselves committed."

The Boers besieged several towns over the next month, and engaged in three significant battles during January and February 1881; at Laing's Nek, Schuinshoogte (Ingogo) and Majuba Hill. The Boers won each, and after the death of Colley in the last, the British government signed the Pretoria Convention, granting Transvaal self-government under British suzerainty, effectively reinstating the South African Republic. Tensions between the British and the Boers never faded however, and in 1899, conflict broke out again with the start of the Second Boer War.

Notes, citations and sources

Notes

Citations

Sources

 
 
 
 
 
 
 
 

 
 
 
 
 

1880 in South Africa
Bronkhorstspruit
Conflicts in 1880
December 1880 events